Many Rivers to Cross is a 1955 American colonial Western film shot in CinemaScope directed by Roy Rowland and starring Robert Taylor and Eleanor Parker.

Plot
Kentucky, the late 18th century: A traveling preacher's coming to town, but Miles Henderson is upset because Cissie Crawford seems reluctant to marry him. She seems more interested in a handsome trapper who has just arrived in the territory, Bushrod Gentry.

Cissie's life is saved by Bushrod after she is attacked by Shawnee tribesmen, but he is a confirmed bachelor who lets her down gently. While traveling on his own, Bushrod is wounded by the Indians and in danger until another woman, Mary Stuart Cherne, saves his life.

Feeling love at first sight, Mary takes him home to her Scottish-born father, Cadmus, and their Indian servant, Sandak, to heal. Her longtime suitor Luke Radford is unhappy about this interloper.

Bushrod again declines a chance to settle down, whereupon an angry Mary ends up keeping him there against his will. With her four brothers keeping a gun on him, Bushrod is forced to marry Mary.

He punches a justice of the peace and gets 30 days in jail. Another trapper, Esau Hamilton, has a sick child whose life Bushrod ends up saving. He slips away and intends to be on his own again, but Bushrod comes across Indians who are trying to scalp Mary. He saves her life this time, then accepts his fate as a man in love...

Cast

Robert Taylor as Bushrod Gentry
Eleanor Parker as Mary Stuart Cherne
with Victor McLaglen as Cadmus Cherne
Jeff Richards as Fremont
Russ Tamblyn as Shields
James Arness as Esau Hamilton
Alan Hale, Jr. as Luke Radford
John Hudson as Hugh
Rhys Williams as Lige Blake
Josephine Hutchinson as Mrs. Cherne
Sig Ruman as Spectacle man
Rosemary DeCamp as Lucy Hamilton
Russell Johnson as Banks
Ralph Moody as Sandak
Abel Fernandez as Slangoh

Opening dedication
"We respectfully dedicate our storyto the frontier women of Americawho helped their men settle theKentucky wilderness. They weregallant and courageous, and withouttheir aggressive cooperation – few ofus would be around to see this picture."

Production
MGM bought the rights to a story by Steve Frazee published in Argosy magazine. Jack Cummings was assigned to produce. Janet Leigh was originally intended to be the female lead.

Reception
According to MGM records the film earned $2,084,000 in the US and Canada and $1,748,000 elsewhere, resulting in a profit of $533,000.

See also
List of American films of 1955

References

External links

1955 films
1955 Western (genre) films
American Western (genre) films
Films directed by Roy Rowland
Films scored by Cyril J. Mockridge
Films set in Kentucky
Films set in the 1790s
Metro-Goldwyn-Mayer films
CinemaScope films
Films with screenplays by Harry Brown (writer)
1950s English-language films
1950s American films